Olavi Blomfjord (born 10 August 1961) is a Swedish weightlifter. He competed in the men's heavyweight I event at the 1984 Summer Olympics.

References

External links
 

1961 births
Living people
Swedish male weightlifters
Olympic weightlifters of Sweden
Weightlifters at the 1984 Summer Olympics
People from Ludvika Municipality
Sportspeople from Dalarna County
20th-century Swedish people